Mytown is the eponymous only studio album released by Irish boy band Mytown. The debut album was the only album released by the band before their break-up in 2001, with two of its members (Danny O'Donoghue and Mark Sheehan) later going on to form the alternative rock band The Script. Four singles were released from the album: "Do It Like This", which was only released in Ireland, "Body Bumpin'", which was only released in the United States, "Now That I Found You", which was only released in the United States and Australia, and "Party All Night". Only the latter of these reached the UK Singles Chart, peaking at No.22. Although the album was planned for release internationally, both the British and Irish releases never saw the light of day; and the album was only released in the United States, Canada and Australia.

Track listing

Singles

 "Do It Like This" (18 March 1997, Ireland)
 "Do It Like This" – Radio Edit – 3:37
 "Do It Like This" – Club Mix – 3:37
 "Starting Out" – 4:11

 "Body Bumpin'" (5 October 1999, United States)
 "Body Bumpin'" – 3:43
 "Now That I Found You" – Album Snippet – 2:00
 "Lifetime Affair" – Album Snippet – 2:00
 "Like Your Style" – Album Snippet – 2:00

 "Now That I Found You" (7 March 2000)
 "Now That I Found You" – 3:56
 "Lifetime Affair" – Live Acoustic – 4:22
 "Like Your Style" – Live Acoustic – 3:18

 "Party All Night" (re-release) (19 June 2000)
 Cassette
 "Party All Night" – Radio Remix – 3:35
 "Party All Night" – Love To Infinity Radio Mix – 3:41

 CD1
 "Party All Night" – Radio Remix – 3:35
 "Party All Night" – Love To Infinity Radio Mix – 3:41
 "Party All Night" – Instant Flava Remix – 4:09
 "Party All Night" – Video – 3:46

 CD2
 "Party All Night" – Radio Remix – 3:35
 "Party All Night" – Love To Infinity Boogie Dawg Mix – 7:15
 "Party All Night" – Love To Infinity Freaky Friday Mix – 6:50

References

1999 debut albums
2000 debut albums
Universal Records albums